Harmohinder Singh Bedi (born 12 March 1950) is a Hindi author, an academician and an academic administrator from the Indian State of Punjab. Since 4 July 2018, he has been serving as the Chancellor of the Central University of Himachal Pradesh. He is also a  Member of the Indian Council of Social Science Research and a Member of the National Monitoring Committee on Minority Education, Govt of India. Before joining Central University of Himachal Pradesh, Harmohinder Singh Bedi had served as Professor Emeritus, Punjabi University, Patiala and as Professor and Head of Department of Hindi, Guru Nanak Dev University, Amritsar. At Guru Nanak Dev University he had also served as Dean and Director of Chairs of Bhagat Kabir, Satguru Ram Singh and Swami Vivekanand.

Recognition: Padma Shri
In the year 2022, Govt of India conferred the Padma Shri award, the third highest award in the Padma series of awards, on Harmohinder Singh Bedi for his distinguished service in the field of literature and education. The award is in recognition of his service as a "Punjabi Hindi Author and Academician with over 30 books to his credit".

Other recognitions
"Hindi Sevi Samman": Honoured by the president of India on behalf of Hindi Sahitya Academy for contribution to Hindi Literature (2015)
National Award of Poetry Book "GarmLoha" from Govt. of India
Shiromani Hindi Sahitkar Award by Punjab Govt (2004)
Himoutkrash Award, Himachal Pardesh (2006)
National Hindi Sewa Purskar (2005)
"Kavi Ratan" Uppadhi by U P Shitya Academy (1987)
Punjab Sahitya and Kala Award (1999)
Punjab Sahitya a Academi Award (2003)

References

Recipients of the Padma Shri in literature & education
People from Punjab, India
1950 births
Living people